Compton Abbas Airfield  is a grass airstrip  south of Shaftesbury, Dorset, England.

Compton Abbas Aerodrome has a CAA Ordinary Licence (Number P851) that allows flights for the public transport of passengers or for flying instruction as authorised by the licensee. The aerodrome is not licensed for night use.

It was from this airfield in May 1993 that tycoon Asil Nadir flew to France in a six-seater Piper Seneca as he fled to Northern Cyprus.

In October 2022 it was announced that the airfield was being sold by the owners, the Hughes family, to film director Guy Ritchie, who owns the neighbouring Ashcombe Estate. Ritchie will take over running of the airfield on 1 February 2023.

References

External links
 
 

Transport in Dorset
Airports in South West England